Torque Mobile is a Philippine smartphone and tablet brand owned and operated by Topstrasse Global, Inc. It was founded by Filipino entrepreneur Chris Uyco in 2008 as one of the first local mobile phone and electronics manufacturers that imports products from original design manufacturers in China to be sold in the local market.

As of 2019, the company also sells e-cigarettes and vapes aside from their usual smartphones.

References

Philippine brands
Mobile phone manufacturers
Mobile phones introduced in 2008